The P.M. Craigmiles House is a historic house in Cleveland, Tennessee, U.S.. It was built in 1866 for Pleasant Craigmiles, a businessman. His son Walter built an opera house in Cleveland called Craigmiles Hall. The house later became a public library.

The house was designed in the Italianate architectural style. It has been listed on the National Register of Historic Places since November 20, 1975.

References

National Register of Historic Places in Bradley County, Tennessee
Houses completed in 1866
Italianate architecture in Tennessee
Houses in Bradley County, Tennessee